Fogwatt/Fywatt is a small village near Elgin, in Moray, Scotland. Fogwatt Community Hall is a local community hall that is situated on the main road towards Rothes. Also Fywatt (Old form Fi-wid) from Norse, Scandinavian word meaning 'A wood in which there might have been a church or a cell'

The Morayshire Railway once passed to the east of the village, but there was no station.

Glen Elgin distillery is located within the village.

References

External links
Fogwatt Community Hall

Villages in Moray